Koistinen is a Finnish surname. Notable people with the surname include:

 Al Koistinen (born 1948), American former politician
 Hannu Koistinen (born 1966), Finnish kantele maker
 Katri Helena Kalaoja (née Koistinen, born 1945), Finnish singer known by her stage name Katri Helena
 Markus Koistinen (born 1970), retired Finnish shot putter
 Matti Koistinen (born 1986), Finnish ice hockey player
 Otto Koistinen (born 1925), Finnish kantele maker
 Petteri "Kode" Koistinen, Finnish guitarist, member of the Finnish rock band Neljä Ruusua
 Ritva Koistinen (born 1956), Finnish kantele player
 Ville Koistinen (born 1982), Finnish ice hockey player

Finnish-language surnames